Batheulima fuscopicata is a species of sea snail, a marine gastropod mollusc in the family Eulimidae.

Distribution
This marine species is found in the following locations:
 Cape Verde archipelago
 European waters (ERMS scope)
 Northern Spain

Description
The maximum recorded shell length is 4 mm.

Habitat
Minimum recorded depth is 805 m. Maximum recorded depth is 805 m.

References

External links
  Serge GOFAS, Ángel A. LUQUE, Joan Daniel OLIVER,José TEMPLADO & Alberto SERRA (2021) - The Mollusca of Galicia Bank (NE Atlantic Ocean); European Journal of Taxonomy 785: 1–114

Eulimidae
Gastropods described in 1884
Molluscs of the Atlantic Ocean
Marine molluscs of Europe
Gastropods of Cape Verde